Cadê as Armas? (Portuguese for Where Are the Weapons?) is the debut album by Brazilian post-punk band Mercenárias. It was released in 1986 via famous independent record label Baratos Afins and re-released in CD form in 1995, with three live bonus tracks recorded in 1988, during a show that celebrated the 10-year anniversary of Baratos Afins.

João Gordo (of Ratos de Porão fame), Edgard Scandurra (formerly a member of Mercenárias, and more well known for his work with Ultraje a Rigor and Ira!) and Vange Leonel provide backing vocals in the track "Santa Igreja".

A music video was made for the track "Pânico", being the Mercenárias' only one.

An old drawing of the Argentinian coat of arms is depicted in the album's cover.

Track listing

Covers
Ira! covered "Me Perco Nesse Tempo" on their seventh studio album 7, released in 1996.

Critical reception
On July 20, 2016, Rolling Stone Brazil chose Cadê as Armas? as the 5th best Brazilian punk rock album of all time.

Personnel
 Ana Machado – guitar
 Lourdes "Lou" Moreira – drums
 Rosália Munhoz – vocals
 Sandra Coutinho – backing vocals, bass
 Edgard Scandurra – backing vocals (track 10), guitar (track 9), percussion (track 5)
 João Gordo – backing vocals (track 10)
 Peter Price – percussion (track 5)
 Marcinha Montserrath – backing vocals (track 10)
 Vange Leonel – backing vocals (track 10)
 Luiz Calanca – production

References

External links
 Mercenárias on Baratos Afins' website 
 Cadê as Armas? at Discogs

1986 debut albums
Mercenárias albums
Portuguese-language albums